Emily Ford (born 8 November 1994) is a British rower.

Rowing career
She has been selected for the British team to compete in the rowing events, in the eight for the 2020 Summer Olympics.

References

1994 births
Living people
British female rowers
Olympic rowers of Great Britain
Rowers at the 2020 Summer Olympics